Yob is slang in the United Kingdom for a loutish, uncultured person. In Australia, the word yobbo is more frequently used, with a similar although slightly less negative meaning.

Etymology
The word itself is a product of back slang, a process whereby new words are created by spelling or pronouncing existing words backwards. The word yob is thus derived from the word boy. It only began to acquire a derogatory connotation in the 1930s.

In popular culture

Popular Redlands, California landmark The Tartan created a drink called The Yob which is essentially a Manhattan shot in a 40 oz King Cobra malt liquor served in a paper bag.

"Yob" is also the title of a 1998 single by TISM, detailing the "ingredients" which go into making up a yob.

The Yobs and The Yobbettes are a cartoon series written for the satirical current affairs magazine Private Eye by Tony Husband since the late 1980s.

UK band The Boys rearranged the "B" and the "Y" in their name and became The Yobs, releasing four singles and one album; 1980s Christmas Album. In this incarnation, the band members used the pseudonyms Noddy Oldfield, Ebenezer Polak, Kid Vicious and H. J. Bedwetter.

See also

Anti-social behaviour order
Bogan
Chav
Feral (subculture)
Hooliganism
Lad culture
Millwall brick
Ned
Pikey
Tapori
Yokel

Notes

References
Burchfield, R.W. ed. The Oxford English Dictionary. (1987) 

English culture
Culture in London
Pejorative terms for people
Australian slang
New Zealand slang
Socioeconomic stereotypes